Dil Chahta Hai is the soundtrack album to the 2001 Hindi film Dil Chahta Hai, directed by Farhan Akhtar, starring Aamir Khan, Saif Ali Khan and Akshaye Khanna. Since its release, the music has received widespread critical acclaim and is considered a milestone in the history of Bollywood film music. It was featured in the BBC Asian Network's Top 40 Soundtracks of All Time list and Planet Bollywood's 100 Greatest Bollywood Soundtracks list.

Background
Initially, director Farhan Akhtar had approached A. R. Rahman for composing the music. But since Rahman was busy with other engagements, he did not accept the offer. Later Rahman commented that he was glad that the project went to Shankar–Ehsaan–Loy and he personally loved their work in the film.

Development
The album has a universal sound, unlike other Bollywood soundtracks of the time. The trio had various influences, including Irish and ethno. Shankar–Ehsaan–Loy along with Farhan Akhtar, Javed Akhtar and Ritesh Sidhwani went to Khandala to finalize the songs, which took a mere three and a half days. When they came back, they booked a studio and completed the recording in three weeks. They also used the Australian instrument Didgeridoo, a wind instrument developed by Indigenous Australians of northern Australia at least 1,500 years ago for the song "Jaane Kyon". They've also used various other traditional instruments like Dholak, Kanjira, Tabla and Flute. Also, the song 'Koi Kahe Kehta Rahe' had three maestros (Shankar, Shaan, KK) coming together for the first time.

Track list

Awards

|-
| 2001
| Udit Narayan for "Jaane Kyon"
| Best Male Playback Singer
| National Film Awards
| 
| 
| 
|-
| 2002
| Shankar–Ehsaan–Loy
| RD Burman Award for New Music Talent
| Filmfare Awards
| 
| 
| 
|-
| 2002
| Shankar–Ehsaan–Loy
| Best Music Director
| Filmfare Awards
| 
| 
| 
|-
| 2002
| Shaan for "Koi Kahe Kehta Rahe"
| Best Male Playback Singer
| Filmfare Awards
| 
| 
|
|-
| 2002
| Alka Yagnik for "Jaane Kyon"
| Best Female Playback Singer
| Filmfare Awards
| 
| 
|
|-
| 2002
| Shankar–Ehsaan–Loy
| Screen Award for Best Music Director
| Screen Awards
| 
| 
| 
|-
| 2002
| Javed Akhtar
| Screen Award for Best Lyricist
| Screen Awards
| 
| 
| 
|-
| 2002
| Shankar Mahadevan for "Dil Chahta Hai"
| Best Playback Singer Male
| Bollywood Movie Awards
| 
| 
| 
|-
| 2002
| Javed Akhtar
| Best Lyricist
| Zee Cine Awards
| 
| 
| 
|-
| 2002
| Shankar–Ehsaan–Loy
| Best Music Director
| Zee Cine Awards
| 
| 
| 
|-
| 2002
| Shankar Mahadevan for "Dil Chahta Hai"
| Best Playback Singer – Male
| Zee Cine Awards
| 
| 
| 
|-
| 2002
| Sonu Nigam for "Tanhayee"
| Best Playback Singer – Male
| Zee Cine Awards
| 
| 
|

Reception and legacy
Dil Chahta Hai is considered to be pathbreaking and one of the best soundtracks to have emerged in contemporary Indian music. The soundtrack stayed away from traditional Bollywood sounds and instead set a new standard for edgy, rock-influenced sounds. The way Shankar-Ehsaan-Loy used thickly layered orchestration and conveyed meaning through Timbre, Pitch and Melody rather than text, was then, probably new to Bollywood. Planet Bollywood's 100 Greatest Bollywood Soundtracks Ever read, "What made Dil Chahta Hai album special at that time was that it was an experimental album and it worked a huge way." According to the Indian trade website Box Office India, with around 20,00,000 units sold, this film's soundtrack album was the year's eighth highest-selling.

References

2001 soundtrack albums
Hindi film soundtracks
Shankar–Ehsaan–Loy soundtracks
T-Series (company) soundtrack albums